The mass media in Mauritius is limited by its small population size (estimated at 1,288,000 in 2008). Nonetheless, Mauritius has a robust economy, and there are a number of major media outlets, including print newspapers, radio and television stations.

Newspapers

Publications appear in French and sometimes English, while others are in an Indigenous language.

Press freedom 

Section 12(1) of the Constitution of Mauritius provides for a presumption of freedom of speech.  Section 287 and 287A of the Criminal Code allows a court to ban newspapers for sedition.  Section 299 of the Criminal Code makes "publishing false news" a crime.  The Newspaper and Periodicals Act was enacted in 1837.  In 1984, a Newspapers and Periodicals Bill was proposed to make it mandatory for newspapers to deposit a financial bond of MUR 500,000 to be allowed to continue to operate.  The bill was opposed by the media.  Forty-four journalists were arrested for protesting against the bill.  In January 2015, a court sentenced the then Vice-Prime Minister to a meager monetary fine for having led an illegal demonstration in front of a daily newspaper and damaged some window panes of the building.

In June 2016, the speaker of the National Assembly, banned the editor in chief of a news magazine from the National Assembly for four sessions because of an editorial about Hanoomanjee’s alleged bias in the National Assembly.

Television

The Mauritius Broadcasting Corporation is the national public television and radio broadcaster. It broadcasts programming in French, English, Hindi, Creole and Chinese. It also operates also in the island of Rodrigues and Agaléga. Other television broadcaster include Canalsat, Parabole Maurice, London Satellite Systems and DStv.

Radio

There are nine Mauritian FM radio stations and two operating on the AM band. The most listened station is Radio Plus followed by Top FM.

Literature

Magazines

Telecommunications

The principal service provider is the public entity Mauritius Telecom together with its strategic partner Orange S.A. Other service provider include Emtel and MTML.

Films

Internet

Mauritius has several operators like Mauritius Telecom, Nomad, Mahanagar Telephone Mauritius Limited (MTML) & Emtel. Each operator uses a different technology to provide Internet access. Nomad makes use of WiMAX, MTML uses CDMA2000 and Emtel uses HSDPA(3.5G). The monopoly is retained by Mauritius Telecom (MT) which provides dial-up & ADSL services over existing telephone lines. High-quality internet access is also widely available in Mauritius; Ebène Cyber Tower, in Ebène CyberCity, hosts the AfriNIC, the internet registry for Africa.

See also
 Mass media
 Media of Africa

References

Bibliography
  (Includes broadcasting)

External links
 

 
Mauitius
Mauritius